Ross Lyden (born 13 April 2000) is a Scottish footballer who plays as a midfielder for Vale of Leven.

Career
After playing for the club's under-17s side Lyden made his senior debut at the age of 16 in a 2–1 victory for Dumbarton over Queen of the South in December 2016, as an injury time sub for Andy Stirling. In doing so he became the first player born in the 21st century to play for the club. He made his home debut in March, again in place of Stirling, in a 4–0 victory over Raith Rovers. Following the disbanding of Dumbarton's youth system, Lyden signed for Clydebank and, in doing so, became the youngest player to ever agree first team terms with the club. He joined Vale of Leven in July 2018.

References

External links

2000 births
Living people
Scottish footballers
Association football midfielders
Dumbarton F.C. players
Scottish Professional Football League players
Clydebank F.C. players
Vale of Leven F.C. players
Scottish Junior Football Association players